A Face in the Crowd is a novella by Stephen King and Stewart O'Nan, originally published as an e-book on August 21, 2012, as well as an audiobook, read by Craig Wasson. A hardcover edition is due to be released in November 2022 in an omnibus edition, paired with Richard Chizmar's The Longest December.

Background information
Stephen King and Stewart O'Nan had previously collaborated in 2004 on a non-fiction book Faithful, chronicling the 2004 Boston Red Sox season. In Faithful, during a discussion about watching baseball on television, King posits an idea for a story entitled "Spectators", which later evolved into A Face in the Crowd:

Later, when speaking and reading an excerpt from his work in progress novel Doctor Sleep at the Savannah Book Festival, in Savannah, Georgia on February 19, 2012, King mentioned the same idea again. After describing the gist of it, King said he did not know how the story ended, so he told the audience, "I'm gonna give this story to you, you guys write it." Incidentally, Stewart O'Nan was in the audience.

See also
 Stephen King short fiction bibliography

References

Novellas by Stephen King
2012 American novels